USCGC Mendota was a  belonging to the United States Coast Guard launched on 20 June 1928 and commissioned on 23 March 1929. After 12 years of service with the Coast Guard, she was transferred to the British Royal Navy as part of the Lend-Lease Act.

Career

U.S. Coast Guard - Mendota 
After commissioning in March 1929, Mendota was homeported in Norfolk, Virginia. On 22 December 1939,  attempted to assist the  Greek steamship Aliakmon, which had grounded north of Wash Woods, Virginia. The  hawser that had been secured to the vessel parted, but Mendota, having arrived a few hours later, was able to float the $200,000 vessel.

Royal Navy - Culver 
As part of the Lend-Lease Act she was transferred to the Royal Navy where she was renamed HMS Culver (Y87) and commissioned on 30 April 1941.

Sinking
On 31 January 1942, while escorting convoy SL 98, Culver came under fire by the German submarine . At 23:31 hours, she was struck twice, once on the port side in the forward boiler room and once further aft that likely struck the vessel's magazine. Culver broke in two and sank in less than a minute. The commander, 7 officers and 119 ratings were lost.

See also
 List of United States Coast Guard cutters

References

Lake-class cutters
Banff-class sloops
Ships of the United States Coast Guard
World War II sloops of the United Kingdom
Maritime incidents in January 1942
Ships sunk by German submarines in World War II
1928 ships